Penny Hammel (born March 24, 1962) is an American professional golfer, who joined the LPGA Tour in 1985.

Amateur career
Hammel was born in Decatur, Illinois. She won several amateur tournaments including the 1979 U.S. Girls' Junior. In the 1979 PGA Junior Championship she finished five strokes ahead of her closest opponent.  As a member of the University of Miami women's golf team, Hammel won the 1983 NCAA Women's Golf Championship, and her team won the title in 1984. She was a 1983-84 All-American and a member of the 1984 U.S. Curtis Cup team. In 1983, she won the Broderick Award (now the Honda Sports Award) as the nation's best female collegiate golfer.

Professional career
Hammel turned professional in 1984 and played on the Futures Tour, winning four times. She was named the Player of the Year.

Hammel joined the LPGA tour in 1985 and won the Rolex Rookie of the Year award. She eventually went on to win a total of four victories on the Tour during her career.

Amateur wins
1979 PGA Junior Championship, Junior Orange Bowl, U.S. Girls' Junior, Illinois Junior
1983 NCAA Women's Golf Championship

Professional wins (4)

LPGA Tour wins (4)

Futures Tour wins (4)
1984 (4) Candlestone Classic, Dave Mason Golf Classic, Tiger Point Classic II, Val Ward Cadillac Classic

Team appearances
Amateur
Curtis Cup (representing the United States): 1984 (winners)

References

External links

Where are they now? A look back at 30 years of Westfield Jr. PGA Champions
Yahoo! Sports Player Profile

American female golfers
Miami Hurricanes women's golfers
LPGA Tour golfers
Golfers from Illinois
Golfers from Florida
Sportspeople from Decatur, Illinois
Sportspeople from Delray Beach, Florida
1962 births
Living people